Future Ruins is the sixth studio album by English alternative rock band Swervedriver. It was released on 25 January 2019 through Dangerbird Records.

Track listing

Charts

References

2019 albums
Swervedriver albums
Dangerbird Records albums